United Nations General Assembly Resolution 217A was adopted on December 10, 1948, to ratify the Universal Declaration of Human Rights.

The resolution was adopted by a majority of 48 countries from among the 58 members of the United Nations at that time; however 8 abstained and the Republic of Honduras and the Mutawakkilite Kingdom of Yemen did not vote.

Voting Results 
The result of the voting was the following:

References

0217
Human rights
1948 in the United Nations
December 1948 events
1948 in law